Benedikt Pliquett (born 20 December 1984) is a German former professional footballer who played as a goalkeeper.

References

External links
 
 

1984 births
Living people
German footballers
Association football goalkeepers
Hamburger SV players
VfB Lübeck players
FC St. Pauli players
SK Sturm Graz players
CD Atlético Baleares footballers
Bundesliga players
2. Bundesliga players
Regionalliga players
Oberliga (football) players
Austrian Football Bundesliga players
Segunda División B players
Footballers from Hamburg
German expatriate footballers
German expatriate sportspeople in Austria
Expatriate footballers in Austria
German expatriate sportspeople in Spain
Expatriate footballers in Spain